George "Wild Child" Butler (October 1, 1936 – March 1, 2005) was an American blues harmonica player, and vocalist.

Career
Butler was born October 1, 1936 in Autaugaville, Alabama, and began playing blues music in bands in the late 1950s, but it was not until 1966 that he began to receive notice, after moving to Chicago and signing with Jewel Records. His early sessions were recorded with Willie Dixon, Cash McCall and Jimmy Dawkins as sidemen. He recorded an album for Mercury Records in 1969.

In 1981, Butler moved to Ontario, Canada, where he played regularly. In the 1990s, he began recording with record producer Mike Vernon in England, which resulted in two albums released on Bullseye Blues.

Butler died on March 1, 2005, in Windsor, Ontario, of a pulmonary embolism, at the age of 68.

Discography
Open Up Baby (Jewel/Charly, 1966)
Keep On Doing What You're Doing (Mercury Records, 1969)
Funky Butt Lover (TK Records, 1976; reissued as Lickin' Gravy by Rooster Blues)
These Mean Old Blues (Bullseye Blues, 1992)
Stranger (Bullseye, 1994)
Lickin' Gravy  (M.C. Records, 1998)
The Devil Made Me Do It (Ace Records, 1999)
Sho' Nuff (APO Records, 2001)

References

1936 births
2005 deaths
People from Autauga County, Alabama
20th-century African-American male singers
American blues harmonica players
American blues singers
American blues guitarists
American male guitarists
Blues musicians from Alabama
Deaths from pulmonary embolism
20th-century American singers
20th-century American guitarists
Guitarists from Alabama
20th-century American male singers
African-American guitarists
21st-century African-American people